Fifth Son of Winterdoom is the fifth studio album by Belgian power metal band Iron Mask, that was released on November 8, 2013 by AFM Records. All songs were composed by Dushan Petrossi. LA Weekly named its cover as the second most ridiculous metal album cover of 2013.

Track listing
 "Back into Mystery" - 05:10	  
 "Like a Lion in a Cage" - 05:07	  
 "Only One Commandment" - 03:47	  
 "Seven Samurai" - 05:24	  
 "Fifth Son of Winterdoom" - 10:03	  
 "Angel Eyes, Demon Soul" - 03:22	  
 "Rock Religion" - 04:38	  
 "Father Farewell" - 04:43	  
 "Eagle of Fire" - 04:20	  
 "Reconquista 1492" - 07:03	  
 "Run to Me" - 04:38	  
 "The Picture of Dorian Grey" - 07:54
 "We Were brothers" (instrumental) (Japan bonus track) - 1:17

Personnel 
Dushan Petrossi - all guitars, orchestral samples
Mark Boals - lead vocals
Vassili Moltchanov - bass
Andreas Lindhal - keyboards
Ramy Ali - drums

References

Iron Mask (band) albums
2013 albums